In cryptography, a distribution ensemble or probability ensemble is a family of distributions or random variables  where  is a (countable) index set, and each  is a random variable, or probability distribution. Often  and it is required that each  have a certain property for n sufficiently large.

For example, a uniform ensemble  is a distribution ensemble where each  is uniformly distributed over strings of length n. In fact, many applications of probability ensembles implicitly assume that the probability spaces for the random variables all coincide in this way, so every probability ensemble is also a stochastic process.

See also

 Provable security
 Statistically close
 Pseudorandom ensemble
 Computational indistinguishability

References 
 Goldreich, Oded (2001). Foundations of Cryptography: Volume 1, Basic Tools.  Cambridge University Press. . Fragments available at the author's web site.

Theory of cryptography